MS Africa Shell, was a British coastal oil tanker operated by the Shell Company of East Africa Ltd. The ship's life was short, lasting only a matter of months from her introduction into service in 1939, until she was intercepted and sunk by the German pocket battleship Admiral Graf Spee in the Mozambique Channel, off the coast of Portuguese East Africa, becoming the sixth victim of Graf Spee's commerce raiding sortie.

History

Pre-war service 
Africa Shell was designed and built in the Greenock yards of George Brown Ltd. Her engine came from the Dutch engineering company Werkspoor N.V., Amsterdam. Following her construction Africa Shell entered into service in the late Spring of 1939.

Second World War

Background 

Following the outbreak of war between Germany and the Allies in September 1939, Adolf Hitler ordered the German Navy to begin commerce raiding against Allied merchant traffic.

Under the command of Kapitän zur See Hans Langsdorff, Admiral Graf Spee sailed from Wilhelmshaven on 21 August 1939, bound for the South Atlantic. She transited through the Denmark Strait, and out into the open ocean where she rendezvoused with her supply ship Altmark on September 1 at a position southwest of the Canary Islands. For the next three weeks Graf Spee remained in the mid-Atlantic until she received her orders to commence commerce raiding on September 26.

The Admiral Graf Spee was under strict instructions to adhere prize rules. This required her to stop and search all intercepted vessels for contraband before sinking them, and to also ensure that the crews of such vessels were safely evacuated prior to any action taking place.

Initially the sortie was successful, and at the end of October Langsdorff sailed his ship into the Indian Ocean south of Madagascar. The purpose of that foray was to divert Allied warships away from the South Atlantic, and to confuse the Allies about his intentions. By this time, Admiral Graf Spee had cruised for almost  and needed an engine overhaul.

Interception 
By November 1939, under the command of Capt. Patrick Dove and with a crew complement of 28, Africa Shell was employed in the coastal waters around southeastern Africa, in the capacity of replenishing supplies of Avgas to be used by flying boats on the Empire Routes of Imperial Airways.

On November 15, Africa Shell was plying through the Mozambique Channel en-passage from Quelimane to Lourenco Marques sailing in ballast.

Africa Shell was not equipped with wireless telegraphy and therefore was not able to transmit the internationally recognised signal: R-R-R (I am being attacked by a raider).

Having stopped the Africa Shell, a cutter with a boarding party was despatched from the Graf Spee and subsequently boarded the tanker, the officer in charge addressing Captain Dove in perfect English with the sentence: "Good morning, captain. Sorry; fortunes of war."

In time the boarding party ordered the ship's company, save the Africa Shell's Master, into their lifeboats before stripping the Africa Shell of all foodstuffs including a small amount of wine.
The crew were ordered to row for shore, however Captain Dove was taken prisoner on board the Graf Spee where he was to be held captive. Capt. Dove was incensed by the interception of his ship, and complained personally to Kapitän Langsdorff, citing that the Africa Shell was within Portuguese Territorial Waters and that the action was in clear violation of international law.

Sinking 
With the crew of the Africa Shell making their way to the shore, and with Capt. Dove transferred to the Graf Spee, the boarding party proceeded to set about the operation of sinking the tanker. Scuttling charges were placed within the ship, and their timers set, following which the party re-embarked in the motor launch and made their way back to the Graf Spee. With all personnel safely aboard the Graf Spee, Langsdorff and his crew observed the detonation of the charges which blew two holes in the Africa Shell's stern. Following this Graf Spee opened fire using some of her secondary armament of  SK C/28 guns, sinking the Africa Shell. Photographic evidence records the sinking.

Aftermath 
The crew of the Africa Shell arrived safely later that day at Lourenco Marques. They reported the seizure of their ship immediately to local authorities, however their report mistakenly stated that they had been intercepted by the Panzerschiff Admiral Scheer, as opposed to the Graf Spee, something which only aided the confusion which the commerce raider's sortie had intended to sew.

Having sunk the Africa Shell Langsdorff left the Indian Ocean, rounded the Cape of Good Hope and made passage back into the South Atlantic.
 
Graf Spee's time in the Indian Ocean yielded a poor return for Langsdorff, the only success being the sinking of the Africa Shell. Richer pickings were to be obtained in the Atlantic and further success was enjoyed by Graf Spee, sinking the Doric Star on 2 December and the cargo liner Tairoa on 3 December, before she rendezvoused with her supply ship Altmark late in the evening of 6 December. Admiral Graf Spee encountered her last victim on the evening of 7 December: the freighter Streonshalh.

Graf Spee subsequently retained Captain Dove along with the Doric Star's five officers, including Captain William Stubbs, who were onboard Graf Spee along with other allied prisoners when she took part in the Battle of the River Plate on 13 December. Following the battle, the damaged Graf Spee made passage to Montevideo and upon arrival all prisoners on board were released.

 Captain Dove became friendly with Kapitän Langsdorff during his period of imprisonment onboard Graf Spee, and would later recall this in his book I Was Graf Spee's Prisoner. Dove's book provided the basis for the Michael Powell and Emeric Pressburger 1956 British war film The Battle of the River Plate, (released in the United States under the title Pursuit of the Graf Spee). In the film the character of Capt. Dove is played by Bernard Lee, however Dove himself makes a cameo appearance as one of the other officers held onboard Graf Spee.

Official number
Official numbers are issued by individual flag states. They should not be confused with IMO ship identification numbers. Africa Shell had the UK Official Number 167164.

See also
 Kapitän Hans Langsdorff
 Admiral Graf Spee
 Battle of the Atlantic

References

Sources

1938 ships
Maritime incidents in November 1939
Oil tankers
World War II shipwrecks in the Indian Ocean
Ships built in Glasgow
Maritime incidents in 1939
World War II merchant ships of the United Kingdom